Adão Pretto was a farmer, Brazilian politician and founder of the "landless movement". In 1990, he was elected as a federal deputy auditor and re-elected as congressman in 1994, 1998, 2002 and 2006.

See also
Central Única dos Trabalhadores
Landless Workers' Movement

References

1945 births
Workers' Party (Brazil) politicians
Members of the Chamber of Deputies (Brazil) from Rio Grande do Sul
2009 deaths